Kate Gillian Storey  is a developmental biologist and head of Division of Cell & Developmental Biology at University of Dundee.

Early education
Storey went to Parliament Hill School, a comprehensive school in north London and attended the sixth form at Camden School for Girls. She received her bachelor's degree in Neurobiology at the University of Sussex in 1983 and her doctorate in Developmental Biology supervised by professor Mike Bate FRS in the department of Zoology at the University of Cambridge, UK.

Research and career
Storey is a developmental biologist who investigates cellular and molecular mechanisms that regulate neural development. Her early work uncovered a fundamental cell signalling switch that controls when and where neural differentiation begins in the embryo...

More recent findings link a component of this, Fibroblast Growth Factor signalling, to molecular machinery that regulates accessibility of neural genes for transcription.

Storey and collaborator Jason Swedlow have also pioneered innovative live imaging techniques for monitoring cell behaviour and signalling within developing tissues. These approaches led to the discovery of a new form of cell sub-division, named apical abscission, which mediates the differentiation of new born neurons 

Storey undertook post-doctoral research supported by a Harkness Fellowship with professor David Weisblat, at University of California, Berkeley 1987–88 and worked with Claudio Daniel Stern FRS at the University of Oxford 1990–1994. She established her independent researcher career as fellow of Christ Church, Oxford University of Oxford 1994, moving to the School of Life Sciences, University of Dundee in 2000, where she has been Chair of Neural Development (2007) and Head of the Division of Cell & Developmental Biology since 2010.

Storey was elected a member of Royal Society of Edinburgh in 2012, the Lister Institute for Preventative Medicine in 2014, European Molecular Biology Organization in 2016 and Academy of Medical Sciences in 2017. She was awarded the MRC Suffrage Science Heirloom Award in 2014 and a Royal Society Wolfson Research Merit Award in 2015. Her research has been funded by the Wellcome Trust, Medical Research Council, Biotechnology and Biological Sciences Research Council, The Anatomical Society and the charity Wings for Life. She was elected a Fellow of the Royal Society in May 2022.

Art
Storey has worked on collaborative science-art projects, including with her sister Helen Storey, MBE. Their most notable work  Primitive Streak<ref name="Primitive Streak",  was funded by one of the first Wellcome Trust Sci-Art awards in 1997. Named after the structure that organises formation of the tissue layers in the early embryo, this exhibition conveys the first 1000 hours of human embryonic development in a series of dresses and textiles.

Family
Storey is married to the marine biologist Jonathan Gordon and they have two children Alexander and Emma Storey Gordon. She is the daughter of the writer and artist David Storey and Barbara Storey.

References

External links 
 http://www.lifesci.dundee.ac.uk/groups/kate_storey//our-research
 https://www.lifesci.dundee.ac.uk/people/kate-storey
 http://www.lifesci.dundee.ac.uk/research/cdb
 https://www.neurogenesisandallthatweare.org/home-1/

British women scientists
Academics of the University of Dundee
Fellows of the Royal Society
Fellows of the Royal Society of Edinburgh
Alumni of the University of Sussex
Alumni of the University of Cambridge
Alumni of the University of Oxford
Year of birth missing (living people)
Living people
Developmental biologists